Cedar Street is a bus rapid transit station on the CTfastrak line, located near the intersection of Cedar Street (CT-175) and Fenn Road in Newington, Connecticut. It opened with the line on March 28, 2015. The station consists of two side platforms serving the busway, with two center passing lanes to allow express buses to pass buses stopped at the station. Along with East Street, it serves Central Connecticut State University.

The New York and New England Railroad (and predecessor Hartford, Providence and Fishkill Railroad) served a station named Claytons at Cedar Street. It opened around 1872, supplementing and ultimately replacing Pratts station, and was closed sometime after 1915.

An access road for the station, Myra Cohen Way, is named for longtime Newington councilwoman Myra Cohen.

References

External links

CTfastrak
Transport infrastructure completed in 2015
2015 establishments in Connecticut
Newington, Connecticut
Bus stations in Hartford County, Connecticut